Rakia, Rakija, Rachiu or Raki, is the collective term for fruit spirits (or fruit brandy) popular in the Balkans. The alcohol content of rakia is normally 40% ABV, but home-produced rakia can be stronger (typically 50%).

Etymology 
Fruit spirits are known by similar names in many languages of the Balkans: ; ; ; ;  (/rɑːˈkiː/, /rɑːˈkuː/, /rɑːˈkɜːr/). Similar drinks include sadjevec in Slovenia, 'țuică (or pălincă) in Romania, and pálenka in Slovakia and the Czech Republic.

Overview 
Rakija is produced from fermented and distilled fruits, typically plums and grapes, but also apricots, pears, cherries or raspberries. Other fruits but less commonly used are peaches, apples, figs, blackberries, and quince. Common flavours are šljivovica and țuică, produced from plums, kajsija, produced from apricots, or grozdova/lozova in Bulgaria, raki rrushi in Albania and Kosovo, lozovača/komovica in Croatia, North Macedonia, Montenegro, Serbia, Bosnia and Herzegovina all produced from grapes. These are the same as "Zivania" in Cyprus.

Similar spirits are produced in Romania, Moldova, Poland, Ukraine, Czech Republic, Hungary, Slovakia, Bulgaria and the Caucasus. In Albania, rakia is most commonly made out of grapes in mild climate regions and out of plums (and sometimes out of mulberry, thanë (carnelian cherry), or walnuts) in colder climate areas.

Plum and grape rakia are sometimes mixed with other ingredients, such as herbs, honey, sour cherries and walnuts, after distillation.

Normally, rakia is colorless, unless herbs or other ingredients are added. Some types of rakia are kept in wooden barrels (oak or mulberry) for extra aroma and a golden color.

It is supposed to be drunk from special small glasses which hold from 30 to 50 ml.

Greek ouzo (from grape) and tsipouro (from pomace), Turkish rakı (from sun-dried grapes) and arak in Lebanon and Levant region differ from rakia as they are redistilled with some herbs (commonly anise). Some tsipouro in Greece is made without anise in the same manner as pomace rakia (or pomace brandy). "Boğma rakı" in Turkey (common name of the domestic raki which is produced at homes and villages) is similar to rakia in the Balkans.

By country

Albania 
Raki (a type of rakia) is a traditional drink in Albania. Until the 19th century, meyhanes would serve wine or meze. Rakia is deeply connected to the Albanian tradition and as such it is produced everywhere in Albania and Kosovo, sometimes professionally and sometimes in an artisanal way. Skrapar is a region of Albania known for the production of rakia. In fact, Skrapar spirit is very popular not only in Albania but also elsewhere in Europe. In every part of Albania, Skrapar spirit is always required in all festive ceremonies, as the best alcoholic beverage. Grapes are grown in pergolas that are arranged in tall trees such as oaks, plums, etc. Overall, the Skrapar area produces a strong spirit with an alcohol content of up to 45%. The most famous villages for the production of rakia are Zaberzan, Muzhakë, Rog, and Vendreshë. After the grapes are harvested, they are pressed and collected in wooden barrels. Today, plastic barrels are used. The crushed grape, at this stage is called bërsi, is left for 25 days, almost a month which is also the right time for fermentation. Proper grape fermentation is also understood by a strong characteristic odor. When this fermentation is achieved, the shoots are ready to produce spirit. The grape shoots are then boiled in tinned and sealed copper pots, the wood used must be oak wood which produces a lot of heat needed to turn the shoots into steam. These vapors then pass through copper pipes which pass through a cold container from where the opposite process is achieved, that of distillation, ie the return to liquid state of the vapors. At the bottom of the tube is placed a small nape from which the spirit flows into a glass or plastic container. The spirit is then stored in small glass bottles. Rakia is produced in a similar way in Kosovo, where it is usually served with meze. Rahovec is the best-known producer of rakia in the country and there is an annual festival dedicated to rakia.

Bosnia and Herzegovina 
Rakija (Cyrillic: Ракија) is very popular and widespread in Bosnia and Herzegovina, just like in its neighboring countries. A major contributing factor to the production of rakija in Bosnia and Herzegovina is the diversity and availability of fruit in the valley of the river Drina and the untouched and very often wild nature in the mountains.
The traditional old craft of producing rakija has managed to survive long throughout time and it is still widely practiced. The production of homemade rakija for private use is the most popular.

Bulgaria 

Bulgaria cites an old piece of pottery from the 14th century in which the word rakiya is inscribed. The inscription on it reads: “I have celebrated with rakija.” The country has taken measures to declare the drink as a national drink in the European Union to allow lower excise duty domestically but has yet yielded no concrete results. During an archaeological study, Bulgarian archaeologists discovered an 11th-century fragment of a distillation vessel used for the production of rakiya. Due to the age of the fragment, contradicting the idea that rakiya production only began in the 16th century, some historians believe this indicates that rakiya did originally come from Bulgaria.
The EU recognizes 12 brands of Bulgarian rakiya through the Protected Designation of Origin (PDO) and Protected Geographical Indication (PGI) marks, which protect the name of products from a specific region that follow a traditional production process.

Serbia 

Rakija is one of the most popular alcoholic drinks in Serbia. It is the national drink of Serbia. According to Dragan Đurić, President of the Association of Producers of Natural Spirits, the EU protects the names of beverages by allowing the prefix Serbian. In Serbia there are 10,000 private producers of rakija. Two thousand are on the official register and only about a hundred cellars produce high-quality spirit. The most popular rakijas in Serbia are: "sljivovica"-it is made from plum, apricot rakija and pear rakija. Belgrade is the site of a Rakija museum. A 14th century Serbian source is the earliest confirmation of Rakija-making.

Croatia 

Rakija is the most popular spirit in Croatia. Travarica (herbal rakija) is usually served at the beginning of the meal, together with dried figs. The Croatian Adriatic coast is known for a great variety of herbal rakija, some typical for only one island or group of islands. The island Hvar is famous for rakija with the addition of Myrtus (mrtina—bitter and dark brown). Southern islands, such as Korčula, and the city of Dubrovnik are famous for rakija with anise (aniseta), and in central Dalmatia the most popular rakija is rakija with walnuts (orahovica). It's usually homemade, and served with dry cookies or dried figs. In the summer, it's very typical to see huge glass jars of rakija with nuts steeping in the liquid on every balcony, because the process requires the exposure of orahovica to the sun. In the northern Adriatic—mainly Istria—rakija is typically made of honey (medica) or mistletoe (biska). Biska, which is yellow-brown and sweet, is a typical liquor of Istria. In the interior of the country a spirit called šljivovica (shlivovitza) is made from plums, and one called viljamovka (viliam-ovka) is made from Williams pears.
Croatia has EU Protected Geographical Indication of 6 rakija products (Zadarski maraschino ,Hrvatska travarica, Hrvatski pelinkovac, Hrvatska stara šljivovica, Slavonska šljivovica and Hrvatska loza).

Turkey 
Raki or rakı is an unsweetened, occasionally (depending on area of production) anise-flavoured, alcoholic drink that is popular in Iran, Turkic countries, and in the Balkan countries as an apéritif. It is often served with seafood or meze. It is comparable to several other alcoholic beverages available around the Mediterranean and the Middle East, such as pastis, ouzo, sambuca, arak and aguardiente. In Turkey, it is considered a national drink.

North Macedonia 
Rakija is one of the most popular spirits in North Macedonia, with the most common types are yellow and white grape rakija.Tikves winery makes the most famous rakija which is made in Kavadarci. A lot of people in North Macedonia make homemade white rakija with natural process from grape distillate and add anise which gives sweetness. In industrial production, the percentage of alcohol in rakija is between 40 and 45 percent, but in domestic production, this percentage can be more than 60.

Romania and Moldova 
In Romania and Moldova, the related word rachiu or rachie is used to refer to a similar alcoholic beverage as these neighboring countries, often a strong fruit-based spirit, usually from grapes. However, the more commonly used terms for similar popular beverages are țuică and palincă; țuică in particular is prepared only from plums. Additionally, the regional term vinars (literally "burnt-wine") in Romania, and divin in Moldova, can refer to brandy in general as well.

Greece 
In Greece, raki (Greek: ρακή) ) is the most popular traditional Cretan spirit, also known as tsikoudia (Greek: τσικουδιά). The Greek raki is a pomace brandy made of twice-distilled grapes and is often produced at home in villages. It does not contain anise and is commonly served cold as an apéritif with seafood and meze, usually referred to as rakomezedes, or as a complimentary digestif with spoon sweets or fruit after a meal. 

The Cretan raki is an integral element of the island’s culture, identified by many as "the national drink of Crete" and linked to hospitality.

When offered, one should never deny a glass of it. Rakomelo (Greek: ρακόμελο) is also a popular spirit made by combining raki with honey (Greek: μέλι) and several spices, such as cinnamon, cardamom, or other regional herbs.

Serving 
In North Macedonia it often served with pristine mountain sheep cheese, variety of salads such as shopska salad cabbage salad, yogurt and cucumber salad, root salads, olives dipped in olive oil, as well as yellow cheese kashkaval and less commonly with pork roast or dried pork meats.

In Bulgaria, rakiya is generally served with shopska salad, yogurt salad, pickled vegetables (turshiya) or other salads, which form the first course of the meal. Muskatova rakiya is made from Muscat grapes, while the preparation method of dzhibrova rakiya is the same as for Italian grappa.

In summer, rakiya is usually served ice cold, while in winter it's served "cooked" (Serbian: кувана / kuvana or грејана / grejana, Bulgarian: греяна (greyana), Croatian: kuhana, rakiya (also called Šumadija tea in Serbia). Rakiya is heated and sweetened with honey or sugar, with added spices. Heated in large kettles, it is often offered to visitors to various open-air festivities, especially in winter. It is similar to mulled wine, as weaker brands of rakiya are used (or stronger ones diluted with water).

Ritual use 

Although wine is the essential part of the Eucharist rite in the Eastern Orthodox and Roman Catholic churches in the region, rakia has found uses in certain religious and related rituals across the Balkans.

At the end of the Orthodox Christian burial service, at the exit from the cemetery, visitors are offered a piece of soda bread (pogača) and a glass of rakia. When drinking "for the soul" of the deceased, one spills some rakia on the ground, saying "For the peaceful rest of the soul", before drinking the rest.

During wedding ceremonies, the groom's father goes around all tables and offers a glass of rakia to all guests, sharing a toast for the happiness of the newlyweds. In general, in the Balkans, rakia is offered to guests in one's home as a welcoming gesture.

It is also used as a sacramental element in Bektashi and Alevi Jem ceremonies, where it is not considered alcoholic and is referred to as 'dem.'

Types 
There are many kinds of rakia, depending on the fruit it is produced from:

Notes

See also 

 Liqueur
 Pomace brandy
 Chacha (brandy)

Notes and references
Notes

References

External links 

 Rakia as special drink

Albanian distilled drinks
Bosnia and Herzegovina distilled drinks
Bulgarian distilled drinks
Ceremonial food and drink
Croatian distilled drinks
Fruit brandies
Funeral food and drink
Guest greeting food and drink
Macedonian distilled drinks
Montenegrin distilled drinks
Romanian distilled drinks
Serbian distilled drinks
Slovenian distilled drinks
Turkish distilled drinks